"Statue of a Fool" is a song written by Jan Crutchfield which has been recorded by a number of country artists including Jack Greene; Brian Collins; Ricky Van Shelton; and Bill Medley, formerly of The Righteous Brothers.

Chart performance

Jack Greene version

Brian Collins version

Bill Medley version

Ricky Van Shelton version

Year-end charts

References

1969 singles
Jack Greene songs
1974 singles
Brian Collins (1970s singer) songs
1989 singles
Ricky Van Shelton songs
Bill Medley songs
Song recordings produced by Owen Bradley
Song recordings produced by Steve Buckingham (record producer)
Music videos directed by Deaton-Flanigen Productions
Decca Records singles
Dot Records singles
Columbia Records singles
1969 songs
Songs written by Jan Crutchfield
David Ruffin songs